With the Naked Eye is a 1979 studio album released by American singer-songwriter Greg Kihn and the first album to be released under The Greg Kihn Band. The album took the band in a new direction, with less acoustically driven songs and a more straightforward rock sound.

The album features a cover version of the Bruce Springsteen song "Rendezvous" as well as a cover of Jonathan Richman's "Roadrunner", which became a live staple for The Greg Kihn Band.

Track listing

Personnel
The Greg Kihn Band
Greg Kihn - lead vocals (all but 8), rhythm guitar
Dave Carpender - lead guitar, backing vocals
Steve Wright - bass, backing vocals
Larry Lynch - drums, backing and lead (8) vocals

Production
Producers: Glen Kolotkin, Kenny Laguna, Matthew King Kaufman
Engineer: Glen Kolotkin, Jeffrey Norman
Mastering: George Horn
Art direction: Niva Port, Reva Fredrickson
Artwork/Design: Hugh Brown
Logistics: Brian Murray, Gerry Blumenthal

1979 albums
Greg Kihn albums
Beserkley Records albums